The Cantanhez Forests National Park (in Portuguese: Parque Nacional das Florestas de Cantanhez) is a  national park in Guinea-Bissau. It was established on 1 October 2007.

The park is home to chimpanzees who attract international study including that of Claudia Sousa.

References

National parks of Guinea-Bissau
Protected areas established in 2007